Eulithidium cyclostoma is a species of small sea snail with calcareous opercula, a marine gastropod mollusk in the family Phasianellidae, the pheasant snails.

Description
The height of the dark brownish shell reaches 2 mm. The broad, very obtuse shell consists of three whorls. These are rounded, and slightly shouldered. The shell is densely pointed or stained. The large umbilicus is subspiral. The aperture is large. The sutures are very impressed.

Distribution
The type locality is listed as "Cape St. Lucas, (Xantus)" (Cabo San Lucas, Baja California Sur, Mexico).

References

External links
 To Biodiversity Heritage Library (2 publications)
 To ITIS
 To World Register of Marine Species

Phasianellidae
Gastropods described in 1864